The 2017 Western Canada Cup was the Western Canadian Junior A ice hockey championship played at the South Okanagan Events Centre in Penticton, British Columbia from April 29 to May 7, 2017. It determined the two Western seeds for the 2017 Royal Bank Cup.  Hockey Canada confirmed after the tournament's conclusion that the all-Western format was being scrapped and that the four participating leagues would resume their Doyle and Anavet Cup rivalries, making this the final Western Canada Cup.

Round robin

Tie Breaker: Head-to-Head, then 3-way +/-.

Results

Semi and Finals

References

External links
Hockey Canada website
Official website

See also
2017 Royal Bank Cup
Western Canada Cup

Western Canada Cup
Western Canada Cup 2017
Sport in Penticton
Sports competitions in British Columbia
Western Canada Cup 2017
April 2017 sports events in Canada
May 2017 sports events in Canada